Viker may refer to:

Places
Viker, Buskerud, a village in Ringerike municipality, Norway
Viker Church, a historic church in the village of Viker in Ringerike, Norway
Viker, Fredrikstad, a village in Fredrikstad municipality, Norway
Viker, Østfold, a village in Hvaler municipality, Norway
Viker, Sweden, parish in Örebro County, Sweden

People
Henriette Viker (born 1973), Norwegian footballer
Ola Viker (1897–1972), Norwegian writer and lawyer